The 1932 United States elections were held on November 8, during the Great Depression. The presidential election coincided with U.S. Senate, U.S. House, and gubernatorial elections in several states. The election marked the end of the Fourth Party System and the start of the Fifth Party System. The election is widely considered to be a realigning election, and the newly established Democratic New Deal coalition experienced much more success than their predecessors had in the Fourth Party System.

Democratic New York Governor Franklin D. Roosevelt defeated Republican incumbent president Herbert Hoover in a landslide, with Hoover winning only six Northeastern states. Roosevelt's victory was the first by a Democratic candidate since Woodrow Wilson won re-election in 1916. Roosevelt took his party's nomination on the fourth ballot, defeating 1928 nominee Al Smith and Speaker of the House John Nance Garner.

In addition to Hoover's defeat, the Republicans also suffered crushing defeats in both congressional chambers: they lost 101 seats in the House of Representatives, with the Democrats expanding their House majority to a supermajority, and also lost twelve seats in the Senate,  with Democrats winning control of the chamber for the first time since 1918. This would be the last time that an incumbent president lost re-election and his party lost control of both chambers of Congress in a single term until 2020.

The election took place after the 1930 United States census and the subsequent congressional re-apportionment. The Reapportionment Act of 1929 provided a permanent method of apportioning 435 House seats; previously, Congress had had to pass apportionment legislation after each census.

See also
1932 United States presidential election
1932 United States House of Representatives elections
1932 United States Senate elections
1932 United States gubernatorial elections

References

 
1932